The Mettlen–Lavorgo powerline, also called the Lukmanier powerline, is the 400 kV three-phase alternating current high voltage electric power transmission line over the Lukmanier Pass in Switzerland, from Mettlen substation, next Inwil, about  south of Hochdorf, to Lavorgo substation, next Lavorgo, about  south of Faido. Trees falling on the line in 2003 caused a major blackout in Italy.

History
The powerline was built in 1948–1949. In 2006, 17 transmission towers between Sisikon and Ingenbohl and in 2008, 28 transmission towers between Arth and Küssnacht am Rigi were replaced.

On 28 September 2003, during a storm, two trees hit the powerline in Brunnen causing a major blackout in Italy.
The loss of power affected most of all peninsula; nearly 50 million people remained cut-off for up to 18 hours.

Description

After Amsteg the Lukmanier Powerline runs on its own track.

On the section between Mettlen and Amsteg 160 pylons are used with two level and three level arrangements of the conductors.

A unique aspect of this line is the 75-metre-high anchor pylon, which stands on 28-metre-high feet of concrete in the artificial lake of Santa Maria, canton Graubünden. This pylon was built in 1949 as a normal pylon. At the construction of the Santa María Dam it was replaced in 1957 by the existing pylon on concrete feet to protect the steel construction from the water and at wintertime from ice on the lake. This pylon carries one crossarm for one circuit.

Sources
Elektro-Energietechnik 2, Prof. Dipl.-Ing. Dr. sc. techn. Gerhard Schwickaardi, AT Verlag Aarau, 1979, pages 218–220Gerhard Schwickardi, Elektro-Energietechnik. Energie-Übertragung, Netze, Energieverteilung, Freileitungen, Kabelleitungen, Schaltgeräte, Schaltanlagen, Energie-Umformung, Messwandler, Transformatorenstationen, Unterwerke, Automatisierung von Schaltwarten'', Band 2, Aarau, Stuttgart 1979

References

High-voltage transmission lines
Electric power infrastructure in Switzerland
Energy infrastructure completed in 1949
1949 establishments in Switzerland